Renée DiResta is a writer and research manager at Stanford Internet Observatory (SIO). DiResta has written about pseudoscience, conspiracies, terrorism, and state-sponsored information warfare. She has also served as in advisor to the U.S. Congress on ongoing efforts to prevent online and social media disinformation.

Career 
Renée DiResta is the current technical research manager for the Stanford Internet Observatory. Formerly, she served as the Director of Research at Yonder (formerly named New Knowledge) and a founder member of Haven, a logistics company. She also worked for the Central Intelligence Agency. DiResta also appeared in the documentary The Social Dilemma and is a contributor at Wired and The Atlantic.

Renée DiResta has appeared on the podcast The Joe-Rogan Experience.

Vaccination 
In 2015, Renée DiResta co-founded Vaccinate California, an organization designed to promote vaccination in California.

DiResta is a proponent of vaccination and has advised the California State Senate on matters of vaccination misinformation. Following an outbreak of Measles in the U.S., DiResta began research into misinformation around vaccines. Along with data scientist, Gilad Lotan, DiResta identified that on Twitter, 25% of anti-vaccine information came from 0.6% of users, in a phenomenon DiResta described as similar to automation. This study additionally identified groups of individuals would actively create false accounts and "shape public opinion about particular policies". This report was used by Vaccinate California and the California State Senate to demonstrate that the majority of Californians were in favor of removal of vaccine-opt out policies, resulting in California Senate Bill 277 passing into law.

In 2021, the Virality Project, an organization DiResta is a part of, released the report "Memes, Magnets and Microchips: Narrative dynamics around COVID-19 vaccines" advising social media sites and health officials on how to counter COVID-19 and vaccine misinformation.

Social media and disinformation 
DiResta has previously written that social media sites, such as Facebook, Twitter, and Reddit, are used as "useful testing grounds for bad actors". Specifically, she wrote that foreign governments, such as Russia, will pilot memes and false stories online to see what can become popular and sway public opinion. DiResta described it as "the asymmetry of passion" where extremist groups will intentionally attempt to reinforce narratives to "shape the reality" of viewers. This, according to DiResta, has seeped into the public policy of vaccines, zoning laws, and water fluoridation".

During her ongoing tenure at the Stanford Internet Observatory, DiResta led investigations into the Russian Internet Research Agency’'s efforts to manipulate United States society and the GRU's efforts to influence the U.S. 2016 Presidential Election. This included a report to the United States Senate Select Committee on Intelligence (SSCI), detailing the means by which the GRU used social media to influence the election and how social media poses on ongoing risk to US politics. This report further stated that Facebook, Twitter and Alphabet's algorithms were intentionally manipulated in a multi-year effort by the Internet Research Agency, directed by the Russian government, and had successfully created false personas that spread misinformation to an estimated hundreds of thousands of Americans. The identified purpose of this effort was to "deepen political divisions".

In October 2022, DiResta joined the Council for Responsible Social Media project launched by Issue One to address the negative mental, civic, and public health impacts of social media in the United States co-chaired by former House Democratic Caucus Leader Dick Gephardt and former Massachusetts Lieutenant Governor Kerry Healey.
Renée DiResta has criticized Mark Zuckerberg's controlling share of Meta and Elon Musk's Acquisition of Twitter, calling for greater transparency and regulation of false information spread on these sites.

Literature 

 The Hardware Startup: Building your Product, Business, and Brand (2015)

References

Living people
21st-century American non-fiction writers
American women writers
Disinformation
Year of birth missing (living people)